Tekyeh-e Sepahsalar (also Romanized as Tekyeh-e Sepahsālār and Takye-ye Sepahsālār) is a village in Asara Rural District, Asara District, Karaj County, Alborz Province, Iran. At the 2006 census, its population was 349, in 106 families.

References 

Populated places in Karaj County